The South African type FT tender was a steam locomotive tender.

A single Type FT tender entered service in 1937, as tender to the sole   steam locomotive which was placed in service by the South African Railways in that year.

Manufacturer
The Type FT tender was built in 1937 by North British Locomotive Company in Glasgow.

The South African Railways (SAR) placed a single Class 21 steam locomotive in service in 1937. The engine and tender were built to the design of A.G. Watson, Chief Mechanical Engineer of the SAR from 1929 to 1936. After trials, the locomotive was placed in service on the Oosterlijn line from Pretoria to the Eastern Transvaal.

Characteristics
It had an unusual wheel structure of six pairs of wheels in a 2-8-2 wheel arrangement, with the leading and trailing wheels in Bissel-type pony trucks and the rest of the axles mounted with a rigid wheelbase. Like the leading and trailing wheels of its engine, all tender wheels were fitted with roller bearings. The rationale behind the design was that, if the tender frame could be carried on more points, represented by the rigidly mounted and Bissel wheels, instead of on only two bogie pivot centres, the frame could be made lighter.

The tender was equipped with a mechanical stoker. The water tank was of welded construction and the coal bunker was of the self-trimming design. Each Bissel truck was compensated with its neighbouring two pairs of rigidly mounted wheels. The eight rigidly mounted wheels were fitted with overhead laminated bearing springs, while the spring gear for each pony truck and two adjacent axles were compensated throughout the springing system, constituting two equal groups. Vacuum cylinders, mounted on top of the tank, actuated brake blocks on the rigidly mounted wheels.

The tender's wheel arrangement did not prove to be very successful and, with the exception of the Type JV tender, a similar experimental tender which had been built in the Salt River shops as a prototype test-model of the Type FT in 1936 during the design phase of the Class 21, it was not used again on the SAR.

It needs to be borne in mind, however, that the Type MR was not equipped with a mechanical stoker, an item which reduced the Type FT's water capacity. On the Type ET tender, for example, the inclusion of a mechanical stoker reduced its water capacity by  compared to the virtually identical manually stoked Type JT tender, while its empty weight was  more due to the mechanical stoking equipment.

Another characteristic unique to the Types FT and JV tenders was their left sides, where both had a space built-in for the fire-irons and rakes. The stowage space was open at the top, where the upper side of the tender was tied to the top of the coal bunker by four metal straps.

The Types FT and JV tenders were similar in appearance, but not identical, the difference being visible on their left sides when comparing the folded-in upper sides to the right of the fourth strap between tender sides and coal bins. The Type JV was the larger of the two with larger coal and water capacities. It was tested behind a manually-stoked Class 15F locomotive, but it is unclear whether it was used again afterwards.

When the Class 21 engine was scrapped at the Pretoria Shops in 1952, its Type FT tender was allocated to Kroonstad Loco as a spare tender for use on Class 15F locomotives since, at the time, all the Class 15Fs shedded at Kroonstad were fitted with mechanical stokers. The Type FT could easily work coupled to these engines because they used the same type of Watson Standard no. 3B boiler and firebox arranged for mechanical firing as the Class 21. The tender was rarely used, however, since it had a smaller coal and water capacity than the Type JT tender normally fitted to the Class 15F.

Locomotive
Only the sole Class 21 locomotive was delivered new with the Type FT tender, which was numbered 2551 for its engine. An oval number plate, bearing the engine number and tender type, was attached to the rear end of the tender.

Classification letters
Since many tender types are interchangeable between different locomotive classes and types, a tender classification system was adopted by the SAR. The first letter of the tender type indicates the classes of engines to which it can be coupled. The "F_" tender could only be used with the Class 21 locomotive with which it was delivered and with mechanically stoked Class 15F locomotives.

The second letter indicates the tender's water capacity.

Illustration

References

FT